The Southern Nevada 2A Region is a part of the Nevada Interscholastic Activities Association, governing the mostly-southern part of Nevada for high school athletics. There are currently 10 member schools in the Southern 2A league for the 2011–2012 school year, one of which is located in California (Needles High School).

Current members

References 

Class Alignment. Nevada Interscholastic Athletics Association (2007-2008). Retrieved on 2012-02-14.
School Directory (PDF). Nevada Interscholastic Athletics Association. Retrieved on 2012-02-14.
NIAA Member Schools Info
NIAA Member Schools Index

See also
Nevada Interscholastic Activities Association
Sunset 4A Region
Northern Nevada 3A Region
Northern Nevada 4A Region
Sunrise 4A Region
Sunset 4A Region

Nevada high school sports conferences